Mary MacKillop Catholic Regional College is an independent Roman Catholic co-educational secondary school, located in , Victoria, Australia. The College s services the South Gippsland parishes of Foster, Wonthaggi, Cowes, Korumburra and Leongatha.

History
The site of the college was purchased in the 1950s; at that stage students seeking a Catholic education had to travel to the Latrobe Valley or to boarding schools in Melbourne or elsewhere. A working party to establish the college began work in the late 1970s, and the school opened to its first students in 1986 on the grounds of a local primary school. The college moved to its permanent site in 1987 and the first permanent purpose-built buildings were constructed in 1989. Government funding and local fundraising have allowed several extensions to be constructed since then.

Notable alumni
 Kaila McKnight - Australian representative to the 2012 Olympics in Athletics
 Angus McLaren - Australian actor who is best known for his roles in the television series Packed to the Rafters as Nathan Rafter and H2O: Just Add Water as Lewis McCartney. 
Eleanor Patterson - gold medallist in High Jump at the 2014 Commonwealth Games

References

Catholic secondary schools in Victoria (Australia)
Gippsland (region)
Educational institutions established in 1986
1986 establishments in Australia
Leongatha, Victoria